Arnold Harrison II (born September 20, 1982) is a former American football linebacker. He was signed by the Pittsburgh Steelers as an undrafted free agent in 2005. He played college football at the University of Georgia.

Harrison also played for the Cleveland Browns and Florida Tuskers.

College career
Harrison played college football at the University of Georgia where he majored in economics.

Professional career

Pittsburgh Steelers
Harrison was signed by the Pittsburgh Steelers as an undrafted free agent in 2005, but did not make any appearances for the team in his rookie season.

In 2006, he played in seven games and finished the season with ten tackles. He appeared in 13 games in 2007 and recorded 13 tackles.

After spending the entire 2008 season on injured reserve with a torn ACL, Harrison was non-tendered as a restricted free agent in the 2009 offseason. However, the Steelers re-signed him to a one-year contract on March 16.

Harrison appeared in eight games and recorded seven tackles for the Steelers in 2009 before being waived on November 17 to make room for linebacker Donovan Woods.

Cleveland Browns
Harrison was claimed off waivers by the Cleveland Browns on November 18. He appeared in four games and recorded five tackles for the Browns before being waived on December 29 when the team re-signed offensive tackle Scott Kooistra.

External links
Just Sports Stats
Cleveland Browns bio
Pittsburgh Steelers bio

1982 births
Living people
Players of American football from Augusta, Georgia
American football linebackers
Georgia Bulldogs football players
Pittsburgh Steelers players
Cleveland Browns players
Florida Tuskers players
Virginia Destroyers players